Kehilla or kehillah means  "congregation" in Hebrew. The term may refer to:

Kehilla (modern), the elected local communal Jewish structure in Eastern Europe (Poland's Second Republic, the Baltic States, Ukrainian People's Republic) during the interwar period (1918–1940)
Kehillah Jewish High School, Palo Alto, California, USA
Kehilla Community Synagogue, a  synagogue in Oakland, California

See also 
 Kehila, a village in Estonia
 Kahal (disambiguation), an etymologically related term
 Qahal, ancient Israelite organizational structure
 Minyan, quorum of ten Jewish adults required for certain religious obligations